Chen Keqiang (born 18 September 1999) is a Chinese footballer currently playing as a midfielder for Henan Jianye.

Club career
Chen Keqiang was promoted to the senior team of Henan Jianye within the 2020 Chinese Super League season and would make his debut in league game on 27 September 2020 against Shanghai Shenhua in a 2-0 defeat where he came on as a substitute for Fernando Karanga.

Career statistics

References

External links
Yuan Ye at Sina.com.cn

1999 births
Living people
Chinese footballers
Association football midfielders
Atlético Madrid footballers
Henan Songshan Longmen F.C. players
Chinese expatriate sportspeople in Spain
Expatriate footballers in Spain